Jean-Claude Lamy (born 3 August 1941) was a French journalist, writer and publisher.

Biography
He was born in Valence in the Drôme department. As a journalist, Jean-Claude Lamy joined France-Soir in the 60s where he stayed over thirty years. There he met Pierre Lazareff and wrote the first biography of the famous newspapers director. In addition, he was also a chronicler at Le Figaro, through which he met the great writers of his time (Hervé Bazin, Marguerite Duras, Albert Cohen, Marguerite Yourcenar, François Nourissier,  etc.) of whom he realized the portraits through interviews. Since 2001, Jean-Claude Lamy is a columnist at the Midi Libre.

In the 1970s, Jean-Claude Lamy became a close friend of Françoise Sagan. The novelist confided her memories, and he wrote, with her agreement and complicity, an important biography, Françoise Sagan, une légende (Mercure de France).

Among the first members were Jacques and Pierre Prévert, who later inspired him a new book, which was crowned by the Goncourt of biography in 2008.

In 2011, he was one of the members of the jury of the Prix Françoise Sagan.

Works (selection)
1972: Au petit bonheur la Chambre, with Marc Kunstlé, cartoons by Cabu, éditions Julliard
2000: La Belle Inconnue, Éditions du Rocher,  prix François-Billetdoux
2001: La Guerre, mademoiselle, Éditions du Rocher,  prix de la ville d'Étretat
2002: Mac Orlan : l'aventurier immobile, Albin Michel, 
2003: Gaston Leroux ou le vrai Rouletabille. Une biographie suivie de Six histoires épouvantables, Éditions du Rocher - 
2004: Brassens, le mécréant de Dieu, Albin Michel, 
2006: La Comédie des livres, Albin Michel, 
2008: Bernard Buffet, le samouraï, Albin Michel, 
2008: Prévert, les frères amis, Albin Michel, 
2011: Et Dieu créa les femmes : Brigitte, Françoise, Annabel et les autres, Albin Michel, 
2012: Éloge du non, Monaco-Paris, France, Le Rocher, 
2013: Le Mystère de la chambre Jeanne Calment, Fayard, 
2013: Le Miroir de la Grande Guerre, Éditions Anne Carrière, 
2014: Éditeur et préfacier des mémoires posthumes de Robert Sabatier, Je vous quitte en vous embrassant bien fort, Albin Michel, 
2015: Chez Brassens. Légende d'un poète éternel, Monaco-Paris, France, Le Rocher, 

References

External links
Jean Claude Lamy on Apostrophes (video)
Biographie de Jean-Claude Lamy on France Culture
Et Dieu créa les femmes de Jean-Claude Lamy on Marie Claire''

1941 births
Winners of the Prix Broquette-Gonin (literature)
People from Valence, Drôme
20th-century French writers
21st-century French writers
20th-century French journalists
French publishers (people)
French biographers
Prix Goncourt de la Biographie winners
Chevaliers of the Ordre des Arts et des Lettres
Le Figaro people